Montana Territory's at-large congressional district is an obsolete congressional district that encompassed the area of the Montana Territory, which was split off from the Idaho Territory in 1864. After Montana's admission to the Union as the 41st state by act of Congress on November 8, 1889, this district was dissolved and replaced by Montana's at-large congressional district.

List of delegates representing the district 
On May 26, 1864, an act of Congress gave Montana Territory the authority to elect a congressional delegate, though the first delegate did not take his seat until 1865.

Notes

References

Former congressional districts of the United States
At-large United States congressional districts
Territory At-large